Vladimirsky Lager is a rural locality (mestechko) in Strugo-Krasnensky District of Pskov Oblast, Russia.

Administratively, it is subordinated to the urban-type settlement of Strugi Krasnye.  Municipally, it is a part of Strugi Krasnye Urban Settlement.

History
The village was founded in 1905 per the ukase of Tsar Nicholas II as an artillery range.  Originally, it was named after the nearby Bronevskaya railway platform, but was named for Grand Duke Vladimir Alexandrovich soon after.

Modern times
The 133rd Guards Anti-Aircraft Rocket Brigade, which had previously been based in Germany, was located in the village. In April 2006 the brigade and the 141st Anti-Aircraft Rocket Brigade were combined into the 1544th Anti-Aircraft Rocket Regiment and transferred to the 54th Air Defense Corps. In 2012, it was relocated to Pskov.

In November 1993, the 25th Guards Motor Rifle Brigade arrived from Adazi. In 1995 its previous parent 54th District Training Centre, in the Baltic Military District (previously the 24th Tank Training Division) disbanded. The 25th Brigade was a low readiness formation but has now been expanded and has run several exercises practising callup of conscripts in the last ten years.

The village also has a train station which is a stop on the Warsaw – Saint Petersburg Railway.

References

Sources

External links
Photo of Vladimirsky Lager

Rural localities in Pskov Oblast